Helmut "Mike" Ajango (November 30, 1931 – November 15, 2013) was an Estonian-born architect based in Fort Atkinson, Wisconsin in the United States. He designed more than 175 churches in southern Wisconsin as well as Fireside Dinner Theatre (1964) and The Gobbler. His work has been described as combining Mid-Century Modern architecture and Prairie Architecture. Fellow Fort Atkinson architect Gene LaMuro worked with Ajango on some of his projects.

Ajango was born in Võru, Estonia and fled with his family in 1944 to Germany when the Red Army returned to resume the Soviet occupation that had begun in 1939. In 1949, the family immigrated to the United States. Ajango graduated from Wittenberg University (1953) after studying art and mathematics and from University of Illinois at Urbana–Champaign (1958) with an architectural degree. He served in the U.S. Army including as a meteorologist for artillery during the Korean War. When he returned home he became a naturalized U.S. citizen.

He established his architectural firm in Fort Atkinson in 1962. He studied architecture in Europe for six months on a Plym Fellowship from the University of Illinois in 1966.

Ajango won the Milwaukee Inner City North Avenue Redevelopment Project Architectural Competition, in 1999 to redesign the buildings on one side of a city block. He bought the Faith Community Church building on Main Street and converted it into apartments. He and his wife Martha had three children. He was a Green Bay Packers fan.

Works
 Fireside Dinner Theatre, Fort Atkinson, WI (1964)
 Gobbler Supper Club and Motel in Johnson Creek, Wisconsin.
 Monument to those murdered by the occupying Russian Army in 1942 in Tartu, Estonia dedicated in 2001 (after a construction delay)
 Mount Pleasant Church in Racine, Wisconsin
 Evansville High School (Wisconsin)
 Watertown office building on Madison, Wisconsin's Monona Drive
 Manchester Building on the square in Madison
 Hoard Historical Museum expansion an renovation
 Mack building and Wilson building renovation 
 Fort Atkinson Municipal Building in downtown Fort Atkinson
 First Federal Building redesign into Fort Atkinson Area Chamber of Commerce office
 Bank of Fort Atkinson expansion and renovation (first), now Johnson Bank
 Black Hawk Hotel conversion for senior housing 
 Nasco additions
 Shalom Presbyterian Church redesign and renovation (became Grace United Church, Ajango's congregation) 
 Wading pool shade cover at the original Fort Atkinson municipal pool 
 Assisted with the dome park shelter at Rock River Park
 Helped develop the chamber of commerce's Fort Atkinson: City of Progress brochure
 Designed staging and sets for the Fort Atkinson Community Theatre
 Wrote and distributed a civil defense survey
 Designed the Fort Atkinson bypass
 Designed signs for chamber of commerce and municipal building 
 Restrooms in Ralph Park 
 Community-built house for a former chamber tourism director.

See also
 Googie Architecture
 Estonia in World War II

References

Further reading
 In Memoriam Helmut Ajango 
 Helmut Ajango photograph collection on Flickr
 Helmut Ajango website
 The mind behind The Gobbler editorial by Doug Moe Wisconsin State Journal

1931 births
2013 deaths
Estonian emigrants to the United States
United States Army personnel of the Korean War
Wittenberg University alumni
University of Illinois School of Architecture alumni
20th-century American architects
Estonian architects
Architects from Wisconsin
People from Võru
People from Fort Atkinson, Wisconsin
Estonian World War II refugees
United States Army soldiers